Jannatul Ferdous ( – 1 February 2012) was a Bangladeshi teacher and politician from Pabna belonging to Bangladesh Awami League. She was a member of the Jatiya Sangsad.

Biography
Ferdous was an assistant teacher of Pabna Government Girls' High School. Later, she joined Pabna Government Women's College and worked there from 1974 to 1995. She was elected as a member of the Jatiya Sangsad from Reserved Women's Seat-5 in the Seventh Jatiya Sangsad Election.

Ferdous was married to Amjad Hossain. He was a member of the Jatiya Sangsad too. They had two daughters and one son.

Ferdous died on 1 February  2012 at the age of 74.

References

People from Pabna District
Bangladeshi educators
7th Jatiya Sangsad members
1930s births
2012 deaths
Awami League politicians
Women members of the Jatiya Sangsad
20th-century Bangladeshi women politicians